At Close Distance, also known or At Close Range is a 2021 Russian-Lithuanian drama film directed by Grigoriy Dobrygin.

Plot 
The film tells about a successful actress who met an unconscious migrant in her house and she decides to take him to her place, but with one condition...

Cast 
 Kseniya Rappoport as Inga Griner
 Nurbol Uulu Kayratbek
 Petr Rykov
 Viktoriya Miroshnichenko
 Aytunuk Zulpukarova
 Nikita Taddei
 Oleg Glushkov

References

External links 
 

2021 films
2020s Russian-language films
2021 drama films
Russian drama films
Lithuanian drama films